Trude Waehner (1900–1979) was an Austrian painter.

Biography
Waehner was born on 11 August 1900 in Vienna, Austria. She studied at Höhere Graphische Bundes-Lehr- und Versuchsanstalt (Higher Graphic Federal Teaching and Research Institute), and the University of Applied Arts Vienna. In 1928 she went on to study at the Bauhaus in Dessau, Germany where her teachers included Paul Klee. In 1938 she emigrated to United States, eventually receiving her American citizenship. While in the United States she taught at Sarah Lawrence College and in 1946 published the paper "Interpretation of spontaneous drawings and paintings". She returned to Europe after World War II where she lived in France and Italy.

Waehner died 18 May 1979 in Vienna.

Waehner's work is in the collections of the Albertina, the Vienna Museum, the Österreichische Galerie Belvedere, the Musée d'Art Moderne de Paris, and the Museo d'Arte Moderna di Bologna.

References

External links

images of Waehner's work on Artnet
A biographical site created by the artists family

Further reading
 Trude. Waehner. Wien 1900 –1979 Wien in German

 
1900 births 
1979 deaths
Artists from Vienna
20th-century Austrian women artists